Leuconostoc is a genus of gram-positive bacteria, placed within the family of Lactobacillaceae. They are generally ovoid cocci often forming chains. Leuconostoc spp. are intrinsically resistant to vancomycin and are catalase-negative (which distinguishes them from staphylococci). All species within this genus are heterofermentative and are able to produce dextran from sucrose. They are generally slime-forming.

Blamed for causing the 'stink' when creating a sourdough starter, some species are also capable of causing human infection. Because they are an uncommon cause of disease in humans, standard commercial identification kits are often unable to identify the organism.

Leuconostoc spp., along with other lactic acid bacteria such as Pediococcus and Lactobacillus,  are responsible for the fermentation of cabbage, making it sauerkraut. In this process, fresh cabbage is fermented in a light brine, where the sugars in the cabbage are transformed by lactofermentation to lactic acid which gives the cabbage a sour flavour and good keeping qualities. Leuconostoc spp. are similarly part of the symbiotic colonies of bacteria and yeast (SCOBY) involved in the fermentation of kefir, a fermented milk beverage and kombucha, a fermented tea.

Species
The genus Leuconostoc comprises the following species:

 Leuconostoc carnosum Shaw and Harding 1989
 Leuconostoc citreum Farrow et al. 1989

 Leuconostoc falkenbergense Wu and Gu 2021
 Leuconostoc fallax Martinez-Murcia and Collins 1992

 "Leuconostoc garlicum" Kim et al. 2002

 Leuconostoc gelidum Shaw and Harding 1989
 Leuconostoc holzapfelii De Bruyne et al. 2007
 Leuconostoc inhae Kim et al. 2003
 Leuconostoc kimchii Kim et al. 2000
 Leuconostoc lactis Garvie 1960 (Approved Lists 1980)
 Leuconostoc litchii Chen et al. 2020
 Leuconostoc mesenteroides (Tsenkovskii 1878) van Tieghem 1878 (Approved Lists 1980)
 Leuconostoc miyukkimchii Lee et al. 2012

 Leuconostoc palmae Ehrmann et al. 2009

 Leuconostoc pseudomesenteroides Farrow et al. 1989
 Leuconostoc rapi Lyhs et al. 2015
 Leuconostoc suionicum (Gu et al. 2012) Jeon et al. 2017

Leuconostoc citrovorum
The name Leuconostoc citrovorum (Hammer) Hucker and Pederson 1931 was rejected in 1971 as a nomen dubium by the Judicial Commission of International Committee on Systematics of Prokaryotes (in Opinion 45).

Phylogeny
The currently accepted taxonomy is based on the List of Prokaryotic names with Standing in Nomenclature and the phylogeny is based on whole-genome sequences.

References

External links
 List of species of the genus Leuconostoc
 Leuconostoc MicrobeWiki

Lactobacillaceae
Garde manger
Bacteria used in dairy products
Bacteria genera